Perinaenia is a monotypic moth genus of the family Erebidae erected by Arthur Gardiner Butler in 1878. Its only species, Perinaenia accipiter, was first described by Felder in 1874. It is here provisionally treated as separate from Xestia, though it seems closely related. Its closest living relatives are not resolved and thus the genus' eventual fate depends on how Xestia is treated.

This species is known from western China, northern India, Tibet and Japan.

References

Calpinae
Moths of Asia
Monotypic moth genera